The Benevolent and Protective Order of Elks (BPOE; also often known as the Elks Lodge or simply The Elks) is an American fraternal order founded in 1868, originally as a social club in New York City.

History
The Elks began in 1868 as a social club for minstrel show performers, called the "Jolly Corks". It was established as a private club to elude New York City laws governing the opening hours of public taverns. The Elks borrowed rites and practices from Freemasonry.

Membership
Belief in a Supreme Being became a prerequisite for membership in 1892. The word "God" was substituted for Supreme Being in 1946.

In 1919, a "Flag Day resolution" was passed, barring membership to even passive sympathizers "of the Bolsheviki, Anarchists, the I.W.W., or kindred organizations, or who does not give undivided allegiance to" the flag and constitution of the United States.

The BPOE was originally an all-white organization. In the early 1970s, this policy led the Order into conflict with the courts over its refusal to allow black people the use of its club and leisure activities. In nearly all instances, the all-whites clause was made public after someone was denied the use of the Elks' dining or leisure facilities. Membership was restricted to whites until 1973.

In 1979, the qualifications for membership included being male, at least 21 years old, of sound mind and body, a citizen of the United States and not a member of the Communist Party.

In Beynon v. St. George–Dixie Lodge 1743 (1993), the Utah Supreme Court ruled that while freedom of association allowed the Elks to remain a men-only organization, "the Elks may not avail itself of the benefits of a liquor license and the license's concomitant state regulation" as long as it violated the Utah State Civil Rights Act. Faced with losing their liquor licenses if they did not admit women, the Elks Lodges of Utah voted to become unisex in June 1993, which was followed by a vote at the Elks National Convention in July 1995 to remove the word "male" from the national membership requirements.

The current requirements include belief in God, American citizenship, willingness to recite the Pledge of Allegiance, willingness to salute the flag of the United States of America, willingness to support the laws and Constitution of the United States of America, being of good character and being at least 21 years of age. There is also a background interview conducted by the Membership Committee, who make the final recommendation to the Lodge members. The members then use a ballot box, with the back drawer first being displayed to the members to be empty, then the members drop their vote one at a time into the hole in the back, typically a white glass marble to accept or a black lead cube to reject.  A 2/3 majority of member votes is necessary for acceptance.

In 1976, the BPOE had 1,611,139 members. As of June, 2020, it claims to have 'more than 750,000 members'.

Women
Until 1995, the Elks had traditionally been an all-male fraternal order. Unlike many other male orders, it never had an official female auxiliary, after passing a resolution in 1907 that ruled "There shall be no branches or degrees of membership in the Order, nor any insurance or mutual features, nor shall there be other adjuncts of auxiliaries". The Elks enforced this resolution through at least the 1970s. Nevertheless, several unofficial female auxiliaries were created: the Emblem Club, the Lady Elks and the Benevolent, Patriotic Order of Does. The Lady Elks appear only to exist on the local level and vary from place to place with regard to its activities. There also does not appear to be any published or printed ritual.

More organized are the Benevolent, Patriotic Order of Does who were chartered on February 12, 1921. This organization does have an organization above the local level, complete with districts, state organizations and a national "Grand Lodge". The Does also have a written secret ritual based on the Magnificat of Mary and which makes reference to St. Paul's First Epistle to the Corinthians Chapter 13, emphasizing love and charity.

The Emblem Club was founded in 1926, with a ritual written by a male Elk. It also has a national organization with local Clubs, State Association and a national Supreme Club of the United States.

In Beynon v. St. George-Dixie Lodge 1743 (1993), the Utah Supreme Court ruled that while freedom of association allowed the Elks to remain a men-only organization, "the Elks may not avail itself of the benefits of a liquor license and the license's concomitant state regulation" as long as it violated the Utah State Civil Rights Act. Faced with losing their liquor licenses if they did not admit women, the Elks Lodges of Utah voted to become unisex in June 1993, which was followed by a vote at the Elks National Convention in July 1995 to remove the word "male" from the national membership requirements.

Racial discrimination

In 1972, the Elks expelled the head of the Ridgewood lodge (Richard J. Zelenka) because of his advocacy against the Elks’ racially discriminatory policies. A resolution to repeal the discriminatory clause of the national constitution of the Elk lodge (see above) passed in 1973 after failing at three previous national conventions.

In 1989, there were allegations of applicants being denied membership in lodges located in various parts of California because of their race.

Structure and organization

Headquarters

The Elks' national headquarters are located in Chicago at the Elks National Veterans Memorial and Headquarters, overlooking Lincoln Park, near Lake Michigan. This building was originally conceived as a memorial to the nearly 1,000 Elk brothers who were lost in World War I. The cornerstone was laid July 7, 1924, and the building was officially dedicated on July 14, 1926.

The rotunda displays murals and statues illustrating the Elks’ four cardinal virtues: charity, justice, brotherly love and fidelity. The friezes depict the "Triumphs of War" on one side and "Triumphs of Peace" on the other. The entrance is flanked by large bronze elks.

Grand Lodge
The BPOE is organized on five levels: the national or "grand" level, the regional level, the state level, the district level and the local lodge level. The highest level is the Grand Lodge, which meets in convention annually. The Grand Lodge elects all the officers of the order, such as the Grand Exalted Ruler—the chief executive officer of the organization—Grand Secretary, Grand Esteemed Leading Knight, Grand Esteemed Loyal Knight, Grand Esteemed Lecturing Knight, Grand Treasurer, Grand Tiler (in charge of regalia), Grand Inner Guard and Grand Trustees. The three Knights assist the Grand Exalted Ruler and officiate in his absence; furthermore, the Grand Esteemed Loyal Knight acts a prosecutor in cases when an Elk is accused of an offense against the order. The Grand Trustee have general authority over assets and property owned by the order. The Grand Esquire is appointed by the Grand Exalted Ruler and organizes the Grand Lodges and serves as marshal of Elks parades. The Grand Chaplain is also appointed by the Grand Exalted Ruler.

Elks Magazine is published 10 times a year and goes to all members.

Grand Exalted Rulers
This is an incomplete list of the organization's Grand Exalted Rulers:

 1871 – George J. Green / Charles T. White
 1872 – Joseph C. Pinckney
 1874 – James W. Powell / Henry P. O'Neil
 1876 – Frank Girard
 1878 – George R. Maguire
 1879 – Charles E. Davies / Louis C. Waehner
 1880 – Thomas E. Garrett
 1882 – John J. Tindale
 1883 – Edwin A. Perry
 1884 – Henry S. Sanderson
 1910 – August Herrmann (1859–1931)
 1919 – Frank Lewis Rain (1877–1941)
 1924 – John G. Price (1871–1930)
 1935 – James T. Hallinan (1889–1969)
 1959 – William S. Hawkins (1910–1971)
 1968 - Robert E. Boney
 2000 – Dwayne E. Rumney
 2001 – Arthur Mayer, Jr.
 2002 – Roger R. True
 2003 – Amos A. McCallum
 2004 – James M. McQuillan
 2005 – Louis James Grillo
 2006 – Arthur H. "Jack" Frost, III
 2007 – F. Louis Sulsberger
 2008 – Paul D. Helsel
 2009 – James L. Nichelson
 2010 – Michael F. Smith
 2011 – David R. Carr
 2012 – Thomas S. Brazier
 2013 – Millard C. Pickering
 2014 – John D. Amen
 2015 – Ronald L. Hicks
 2016 – Michael F. Zellen
 2017 – Malcolm J. McPherson Jr.
 2018 – Michael T. Luhr
 2019 – Robert L. Duitsman
 2020 – Paul R. Ryan
 2021 – T. Keith Mills
 2022 – Bruce A. Hidley

Source:

State Associations and Lodges
The state level organizations are called "State Associations"; state level officers include presidents, vice presidents, secretaries and treasurers. Local groups are called "Subordinate Lodges". Lodges officers are essentially the same as the ones on the national level, with "Grand" prefix removed. Lodges also may establish dinner and recreational clubs for members. In 1979 there were 2,200 lodges Lodges which are incorporated are required to be governed by a board of directors. Otherwise the Lodge Trustees are the governing board.

Elks Mutual Benefit Association
Like many other fraternal orders, the Elks at one point sponsored an insurance fund. The Elks Mutual Benefit Association was founded in 1878. At the 1885 Grand Lodge it was reported that the EMBA was prosperous, but its finances were carelessly managed. The Association was disbanded after the 1907 Grand Lodge passed a resolution banning mutual or insurance features, as well as degrees and auxiliaries.

Antlers
Despite its 1907 resolution banning any auxiliaries, the Elks at one point had a youth affiliate for young men called the Antlers. The first chapter was organized in February 1922 by San Francisco Lodge #3. The 1927 Grand Lodge approved the junior order, granting the Grand Exalted Ruler the power to permit subordinate lodges to instituted organizations for males under 21. In 1933, there were 45 local units of the Antlers with 3,584 members. However, the Antlers numbers were decimated during the Second World War, with so many young men having gone off to war. Despite 86 local Antlers groups still existing in 1946, the Grand Lodge deleted all reference to them in their constitution and bylaws that year. However, some local Antlers groups were still active in 1979, according to one source.

Activities

Social quarters

Most Elks lodges operate a social quarters with a private bar. According to sociologists Alvin J. Schmidt and Nicholas Babchuk, members primarily joined the Elks to be "provided with entertainment, liquor, and food at reasonable rates" in the social quarters.

National charity programs
Lodges are encouraged to participate in national Elks charity programs. There are also State Elks Associations charity programs. This usually includes a State Major Project. Elks Lodges are usually involved in other local charitable efforts.

Due to the willingness of most Elks Lodges to respond to community needs and events, it is common to turn the BPOE abbreviation into a backronym for "Best People on Earth".

Elks National Foundation

Established in 1928, the Elks National Foundation is the charitable arm of the BPOE. The foundation, with an endowment valued at more than $750 million, has contributed more than $500 million toward Elks' charitable projects nationwide. Since inception, the Elks have received more than $288.7 million in contributions and bequests. As of the close of the 2021 fiscal year, they boast more than 120,000 active donors and an endowment fund valued at $833.1 million.

Veteran services
The Elks pledge that "So long as there are veterans, the Benevolent and Protective Order of Elks will never forget them." 
 Elks Veterans Memorial in Chicago, Illinois
 The Army of Hope, established in 2003, primarily serves families of deployed service members.
 Adopt-a-Veteran Program
 Freedom Grants!
 Veterans Leather Program
 Veterans Remembrance
 Playing Cards for Veterans
 Re-Creation USA

Youth programs
 Elks National Foundation Scholarships
 Hoop Shoot (National free throw contest)
 Drug Awareness
 Soccer Shoot
 Junior Golf Program
 Dictionary Project
 Youth Recognition

Americanism

The Elks have shown their devotion to Americanism by conducting bond drives, promoting civil defense programs and Flag Day observance. During World War II, they designated the week of March 15, 1942 "Win the War Week" and helped recruit for the United States Army Air Corps. An "Elks National Service Commission" was in operation from 1946 to 1950, and the Grand Lodge adopted a "Declaration of American Principles" in 1961 in Miami.

Elks National Home
The Elks National Home is a retirement home in Bedford, Virginia built in 1916. In late 2013 the Elks sold the home to a private organization.

Rites and traditions

The Elks originally borrowed a number of rites, traditions, and regalia from the Freemasons. However, by the first decade of the twentieth century, much of this had been abandoned as the Elks sought to establish their own identity. The original two degrees required for membership were consolidated into one degree in 1890, the apron was discontinued in 1895, the secret password was gone in 1899, and the badges and secret handshake were abandoned by 1904.

Initiation and funeral rites still exist, however. The initiation rite is not considered a secret. The initiation involves an altar, with a Bible upon it and chaplain leading the brethren in prayers and psalms. The candidate must accept a "solemn and binding obligation" to never "reveal any of the confidential matters of the Order". He further promises to uphold the Constitution of the United States, protect brother Elks and their families, only support worthy candidates for admission and never bring political or sectarian questions up into the Order. The funeral rite is called the "Lodge of Sorrow" and also involves prayers.

The Hour of Recollection
Deceased and otherwise absent lodge members are recalled each evening at 11 p.m. Chimes or sometimes a bell will be rung 11 times and the Lodge Esquire intones, "It is the Hour of Recollection." The Exalted Ruler or a member designated by him gives the 11 o'clock toast, of which this version is the most common:

Communal burial

The Elks have communal cemetery plots, which are often marked with impressive statuary.

Famous Elks

Athletes
 Babe Ruth New York, NY Lodge No. 1

Politicians

Presidents of the United States
 Warren G. Harding, Marion, Ohio #32
 Franklin D. Roosevelt, Poughkeepsie, New York #275
 Harry S. Truman, Kansas City, Missouri Lodge #26
 Dwight D. Eisenhower
 John F. Kennedy, Boston, Massachusetts Lodge #10
 Gerald R. Ford, Grand Rapids, Michigan Lodge #48

Vice Presidents of the United States
 Alben W. Barkley, 35th vice president of the United States

Governors
 Fred P. Cone, Florida (1937–1941)
 David Sholtz, Governor Florida (1933–1937), Exalted Ruler of Florida.
 William M. Tuck, Danville, Virginia, Lodge #227 Governor of Virginia (1946–1950)
Gov. Daniel Jackson Evans Washington 1965 - 1977
Republican

Members of Congress
 Richard E. Connell – United States Representative representing New York
 Barry Goldwater – United States Senator representing Arizona

Other politicians
 Lonnie O. Aulds, member of the Louisiana House of Representatives from 1968 to 1972, real estate developer in Shreveport, Louisiana
 Edward Francis Blewitt, Pennsylvania State Senator and businessman. Great-grandfather of the 46th and current President of the United States, Joe Biden
 Armand Brinkhaus, member of both houses of the Louisiana State Legislature from St. Landry Parish
 Richard J. Daley, 48th Mayor of Chicago
 David Dank, member of Oklahoma House of Representatives since 2007
 Gilbert L. Dupré, state representative and district court judge in St. Landry Parish, Louisiana
 Emory Cole, lawyer and state legislature in Baltimore, Maryland
 Truly Hatchett, first African American member of the Maryland House of Delegates and real estate investor.
 John McCormack, 45th Speaker of the United States House of Representatives

Military
 Captain Eddie Rickenbacker

Business people
 Jack Christian, Automobile dealer, former Mayor/President of Baton Rouge, Louisiana
Marc Beede Owner of Kalispell Montana Aireserv

Entertainers
 Lawrence Welk
 Jack Benny
 Irving Berlin

See also
 List of Elks buildings
 Elks of Canada
 Improved Benevolent and Protective Order of Elks of the World
 Moose Lodge

Notes and references

External links

 
 Unofficial site – collection of images and articles illustrating early Elkdom
  Link to State Association pages

 
1868 establishments in the United States
Men's organizations in the United States
Organizations established in 1868
Service organizations based in the United States